The Pelly Formation is a lava flow in the Yukon Territory, Canada. It was erupted during the Pleistocene and is in the Volcano Mountain area in the northern portion of the Northern Cordilleran Volcanic Province.

See also
List of volcanoes in Canada
Volcanism of Canada
Volcanism of Northern Canada

References

Volcanism of Yukon
Pleistocene volcanism
Cenozoic Yukon
Stratigraphy of Yukon